Eden near Gardner, Louisiana is a house built perhaps around 1850.  It was added to the National Register of Historic Places in 1984.

It is a central hall plan house, two rooms deep, with a rear ell wing. While family history suggests it was built around 1830 by Pleasant H. Hunter, evidence such as its heavy ogee moldings suggest a later date.  In 1984, its original four chimneys and four aedicule style mantels survived.

It was listed as one result of a study of 10 Neo-Classical farm-plantation houses along Bayou Rapides.  As for several of the others (China Grove, Geneva, Hope, Island Home, Longview, Eden was modified by addition of hood along its original gallery, termed a false gallery, which provides additional protection from the rain, detracting somewhat but not greatly from its original appearance.

References

Houses on the National Register of Historic Places in Louisiana
Houses completed in 1850
Houses in Rapides Parish, Louisiana
Neoclassical architecture in Louisiana
National Register of Historic Places in Rapides Parish, Louisiana